Arun may refer to:

People
 Arun (given name)
 Arun (surname)

Places
 Arun, Badakhshan, Afghanistan
 Arun (England), a region of southeasthern England
 Arun District, West Sussex, England
 Arun Banner, an administrative division (banner) of Inner Mongolia, China
 Arun, Sumatra, a vassal state, now in Indonesia
 Arun gas field, Sumatra, Indonesia
 Aran va Bidgol ('Aran and Bidgol'), Isfahan Province, Iran
Aran va Bidgol County
 Arun rural municipality, Nepal
 Wat Arun, a temple in Bangkok, Thailand

Rivers and canals
 Arun River, China–Nepal
 River Arun, in West Sussex, England
 Wey and Arun Canal, in the south east of England

Other uses
 Aruṇa, a god in Hinduism
 Arun-class lifeboat
 , two ships of the Royal Navy

See also

 Aaron (disambiguation)
 Arran (disambiguation)
 Aruna (disambiguation)
 Arruns or Aruns, an Etruscan praenomen
 Arundel, a town in West Sussex, England
 , a 1938 cargo ship 
 , a 1922 cargo ship